One for Fun is an album by American jazz pianist Billy Taylor released in 1959 on the Atlantic label.

Reception

Allmusic awarded the album 3 stars.

Track listing
All compositions by Billy Taylor except as indicated
 "Summertime" (George Gershwin, DuBose Heyward) - 3:45
 "One for Fun" - 3:32
 "That's for Sure" - 1:53
 "A Little Southside Soul" - 4:23
 "Blue Moon" (Richard Rodgers, Lorenz Hart) - 5:04
 "Makin' Whoopee" (Walter Donaldson, Gus Kahn) - 4:24
 "Poinciana" (Nat Simon, Buddy Bernier) - 5:28
 "At Long Last Love" (Cole Porter) - 3:31
 "When Lights Are Low" (Benny Carter, Spencer Williams) - 5:04

Personnel 
Billy Taylor - piano
Earl May - bass
Kenny Dennis - drums

References 

1959 albums
Atlantic Records albums
Billy Taylor albums
Albums produced by Nesuhi Ertegun